This is a list of alumni of Magdalene College, Cambridge.

 M.H. Abrams, literary theorist and critic
 J.R. Ackerley, writer and poet
 Simon Ambrose, winner of The Apprentice (UK series three)
 Richard Atkinson, Bishop of Bedford
 Giles Baring, cricketer
 Simon Barrington-Ward, Bishop of Coventry, 1985–1997
 Henry Bellingham, Baron Bellingham, Member of Parliament for North West Norfolk, former junior minister at the Foreign and Commonwealth Office
 Peter Beck, soldier and schoolmaster
 A. C. Benson, librettist of Land of Hope and Glory
 Michael Binyon, foreign correspondent for The Times, now Leader Writer
 Patrick Blackett, Nobel Prize winning physicist
 Norman Blake, Middle English and Early Modern English language and literature scholar
 Sir John Boardman, archaeologist, Professor of Classical Art and Archaeology
 John Bromley, 17th-century Catholic convert and translator of The Catechism for the Curats, composed by the Decree of the Council of Trent, faithfully translated into English (London 1687)
 Charles Vyner Brooke, last White Rajah of Sarawak
 Anthony Bull, transport engineer
 David Burghley, Olympic champion, 400m hurdles
 Clemency Burton-Hill, broadcaster, novelist, journalist, and violinist
 Anthony Caesar, English priest and composer
 Sir David Calcutt, former Master and barrister
 Henry Chadwick KBE, former head of Christ Church, Oxford
 Greg Clark, Member of Parliament for Tunbridge Wells, former Secretary of State for Business, Energy and Industrial Strategy and former President of the Board of Trade
 Arthur Cohen, lawyer and Liberal politician; first Jewish graduate of Cambridge University
 Hashmatrai Khubchand Chainani, Chief Justice of Bombay High Court
 Peter Cowie, film historian
 Stella Creasy, Member of Parliament for Walthamstow
 Joe Crowley, TV presenter and broadcast journalist
 Robyn Curnow, South African journalist and news anchor
 Katie Derham, TV newsreader
 Monty Don, gardener
 Kulada Charan Das Gupta, Chief Justice of Calcutta High Court
 William Donaldson, creator of Henry Root
 Henry Dunster, first President of Harvard University
 William Empson, literary critic and poet
 Julian Fellowes, actor and Academy Award winning screenwriter
 Eric Fernihough, Brooklands and world motorcycle speed record holder
 Peter Fudakowski,  Academy Award winning film producer
 Bamber Gascoigne, TV presenter, University Challenge
 Robin Gibson, former Chief Curator, National Portrait Gallery, art historian & writer
 Siram Govindarajulu, founding vice-chancellor Sri Venkateswara University
 Karl W. Gruenberg, British mathematician
 Prince Richard, Duke of Gloucester, member of the British Royal Family
 Prince William of Gloucester, member of the British Royal Family
 Maurice Goldhaber, American physicist
 David Grainger, British Venture Capitalist
Charles Grant, 1st Baron Glenelg, British politician and colonial administrator; older brother of Robert
 Sir Robert Grant (MP), British lawyer, politician, and hymnist; younger brother of Charles
 Sir Christopher Greenwood QC, Judge of the International Court of Justice (2009-2018)
 Antony Grey, pioneer gay rights activist
 Loyd Grossman, Chef, Musician, Television presenter, sauce maker
 Sir Norman Hartnell, couturier and dressmaker to the Queen
 Abdul Khalek Hassouna, Egyptian politician and diplomat, Secretary-General of the Arab League
 Gavin Hastings OBE, rugby international
 Julian Haviland, former Political Editor of ITN and The Times newspaper
 Nick Herbert, Member of Parliament for Arundel and South Downs, former Minister of State for Justice
 Adam Holloway, Member of Parliament for Gravesham
 Sir Antony Jay, author, Yes Minister
 Richard Johnson, First chaplain to Australia
 Igor Judge, Baron Judge, Lord Chief Justice of England and Wales
 Nick Kaufman, lawyer
 Akhtar Hameed Khan, social scientist
 Charles Kingsley, author of The Water Babies and Regius Professor of Modern History
 R. F. Kuang, an award-winning Chinese-American fantasy writer and author of The Poppy War series.
 Lewis H. Lapham, American writer, editor of Lapham's Quarterly; former editor of Harper's Magazine
 Charles La Trobe, first Lieutenant-Governor of Victoria, Australia
 Sir Trafford Leigh-Mallory, air vice marshal, Battle of Britain
 Chris Lintott, astrophysicist
 Selwyn Lloyd, former Foreign Secretary, Chancellor of the Exchequer and Speaker of the House of Commons
 John McPhee, Pulitzer Prize-winning writer
 Mark Malloch Brown, Baron Malloch-Brown, former United Nations Deputy Secretary-General and Minister of State at the Foreign and Commonwealth Office
 George Mallory, mountaineer who took part in the first three British expeditions to Mount Everest in the early 1920s.
 William S. Mann, music critic on The Times, 1948–82
 John Manningham, sixteenth- and seventeenth-century diarist, lawyer; noted for recording details of an original performance of Shakespeare's Twelfth Night
 Kingsley Martin, journalist
 Sir Samuel Morland, diplomat, spy, inventor, mathematician
 Michael Morris, 3rd Baron Killanin, former President of the International Olympic Committee
 Roger Morris, electrical engineer
 Sir Andrew Morritt, Chancellor of the High Court of Justice
 Sir Nicholas John Gorrod Blake, Judge of the High Court of Justice
 Sir Simon Picken, Judge of the High Court of Justice
 Sir Simon Bryan, Judge of the High Court of Justice
 Ronald Muwenda Mutebi II, current King or Kabaka of Buganda
 Sir Edward Frederick Mutesa II, former King or Kabaka of Buganda and President of Uganda
 Mike Newell, film director whose works include Four Weddings and a Funeral and Harry Potter and the Goblet of Fire
 Adam Nicolson, historian and author, son of Nigel Nicolson and grandson of Vita Sackville-West and Harold Nicolson
 C. K. Ogden, literary critic
 Sir Jonathan Parker, Lord Justice of Appeal
 Sir Christopher Staughton, Lord Justice of Appeal
 Sir John Murray Chadwick, Lord Justice of Appeal
 Charles Stewart Parnell (did not graduate), Irish nationalist
 Samuel Pepys, naval administrator, MP, and diarist
 Ardal Powell, maker and player of historical flutes
 Francis Pym, former Secretary of State for Foreign and Commonwealth Affairs
 Michael Ramsey, Archbishop of Canterbury
 I.A. Richards, literary critic
 Julian Rathbone, English novelist
 Sir Michael Redgrave, actor
 Jon Ridgeon, former British Olympic athlete and current CEO of World Athletics
 Alan Rusbridger, editor, The Guardian
 Warren Sach, United Nations executive
 Sir Frederic Salusbury, editor, Daily Herald
 Rina Sawayama, singer
 Nicholas Shakespeare, novelist
 John Simpson, journalist
 Nicholas Snowman, arts administrator and chairman of the jewellers Wartski
 John Young Stratton, author, essayist, social reformer and campaigner against rural poverty
 Arthur Tedder, 1st Baron Tedder, Marshal of the Royal Air Force, World War II
 John Tedder, 2nd Baron Tedder, Professor of Chemistry, expert in free radical chemistry
 Nanavira Thera, Buddhist monk
 Charit Tingsabadh, Thai economist
 Allen Dain Percival CBE, musician and composer; Principal of the Guildhall School of Music; executive chairman of Stainer & Bell
 Philip Vellacott, classical scholar
 Roger Vignoles, concert pianist and accompanist
 Rob Wainwright, rugby international
 Wong Yan-lung, Secretary for Justice of Hong Kong
 Geoffrey Webb, art historian
 Geoffrey Whitney, sixteenth-century poet and emblematist

References

 
Magdalene